This is a list of Norfolk State Spartans football players in the NFL Draft.

Key

Selections

References

Norfolk State

Norfolk State Spartans NFL Draft